Tuol Kouk (TK;  ; meaning "Dry Hill") is a section (khan) in Phnom Penh, Cambodia. Tuol Kouk is well known for the large villas in its northern part of the district. This district is subdivided into 10 sangkats and 143 villages. The district has an area of 7.99 km2. After boundary changes, its population has decreased to 145,570.

Tuol Kouk contains a mixture of villas, small wooden houses, commercial warehouses and NGO offices (including Live and Learn Environmental Education). The Toul Kouk intersection at street 298 and Confederation de la Russie is the primary entrance to Tuol Kouk and marks the eastern extreme of the Royal University of Phnom Penh main campus. The ministries of Defense, Rural Development, Women’s Affairs, and a variety of commercial enterprises are located along the main roads of the district.

Education
Home of English International School has a Toul Kork Branch in Sen Sok Section.

The Canadian International School of Phnom Penh previously had a Tuol Kork preschool campus, which opened in 2016. This campus was in the Sunway Tuol Kork.

References

Districts of Phnom Penh